I

Joseph William John Taylor (born 18 November 2002) is a professional footballer who plays as a forward for EFL Championship club Luton Town. Born in England, he is a youth international for Wales.

Career

Non League
Taylor signed a one-year contract extensions with National League club King's Lynn Town in December 2020. Taylor joined Eastern Counties League Premier Division club Wroxham on loan ahead of the 2021–22 season, making his debut on the opening day against Walsham-le-Willows. In his first home match, Taylor scored a hat-trick as his side thrashed Thetford Town 7–2. In October 2021, Taylor was recalled by King's Lynn after scoring 21 goals in just thirteen appearances and made his National League debut off of the bench in a 1–0 home defeat to Solihull Moors.

Peterborough United
On 15 November 2021, Taylor joined Championship club Peterborough United for an undisclosed fee on a two-and-a-half year deal, initially joining up with the club's under-23 squad. In December 2021, it was reported that Taylor had been impressing in the under-23 squad and would begin training with the first-team. After scoring a hat-trick in a Premier League Cup quarter-final victory against Charlton Athletic, Taylor made his first-team debut four days later on 8 March 2022 in a 1–1 draw with second-placed AFC Bournemouth.

He scored his first goal for Peterborough in an EFL Cup win over Plymouth Argyle on 10 August 2022.

Luton Town
On 31 January 2023, Taylor signed for Championship club Luton Town for an undisclosed fee.

International
In September 2022 Taylor made his debut for the Wales national under-21 football team in the starting line-up for the 2-0 friendly match defeat against Austria under-21.

Career Statistics

References

2002 births
Living people
Sportspeople from King's Lynn
Footballers from Norfolk
Welsh footballers
Wales under-21 international footballers
English people of Welsh descent
Association football forwards
Norwich City F.C. players
King's Lynn Town F.C. players
Wroxham F.C. players
Peterborough United F.C. players
Luton Town F.C. players
Eastern Counties Football League players
National League (English football) players
English Football League players